Dajuan Graf (born December 16, 1992) is an American professional basketball player for Bashkimi Prizren of the Kosovo Basketball Superleague. He attended and played college basketball for North Carolina Central University.

Early life
Graf was born in Charlotte, North Carolina.

Club career
In July 2020, Graf signed with Kharkivski Sokoly of the Ukrainian Basketball Superleague. He left the team in January 2022. On March 16, 2022, Graf signed with KB Ylli of the Kosovo Basketball Superleague.

References

American expatriate basketball people in Ukraine
American men's basketball players
Basketball players from Charlotte, North Carolina
Point guards
BC Kharkivski Sokoly players
1992 births
Living people
KK Alkar players